Borun (also Romanized as Borūn; also known as Baruq, Borāq, Borveh, and Buruh) is a village in, and the capital of, Borun Rural District of Eslamiyeh District, Ferdows County, South Khorasan province, Iran. At the 2006 National Census, its population was 717 in 283 households, when it was in the Central District. The following census in 2011 counted 680 people in 260 households. The latest census in 2016 showed a population of 644 people in 251 households; it was the largest village in its rural district.

After the census, Eslamiyeh District was established by combining Baghestan Rural District, Borun Rural District, and the city of Eslamiyeh.

References 

Ferdows County

Populated places in South Khorasan Province

Populated places in Ferdows County